Sheila Mullen may refer to:

 Sheila Mullen (model) (born 1957), American model
 Sheila Mullen (artist) (born 1942), Scottish painter